This is a list of Miami RedHawks football players in the NFL Draft.

Key

Selections

See also
List of Miami University people

References

Miami Redhawks

Miami RedHawks NFL Draft